Hill 777 or Givat Arnon is an Israeli outpost in the West Bank, a 12 kilometer drive from Itamar, under the jurisdiction of the Shomron Regional Council, 28 km inside the Green Line.

Hill 777, like all Israeli outposts, is illegal under Israeli law. The international community views Israeli outposts as Israeli settlements and considers them also illegal under international law, but the Israeli government disputes this.

History
The Hill 777 outpost was founded in 1999. Despite being 5.6 km from Itamar, it is an outpost of Itamar.

The name Givat Arnon was given in memory of Aryeh Agranioni. In May 2001, Agranioni was guarding a railway container housing agricultural equipment on Hill 777. While on guard he was murdered with his own gun.

Originally Hill 777 was an unrecognized outpost, and in 2000 were forced to evacuate and the residents moved to Hill 830. The murder of Agranioni helped accelerate the issuing of a military permit enabling the Hill 777 outpost. Residents returned home to Hill 777 only one year after leaving.

Population
Currently there are 7 families living on Hill 777. These residents are currently living in 6 caravans and a container.

References

Unauthorized Israeli settlements
Populated places established in 1999
1999 establishments in the Palestinian territories
Israeli outposts